The Chessler is a mountain of the Silvretta Alps, overlooking the valley of Monbiel, east of Klosters in the canton of Graubünden.

References

External links
 Chessler on Hikr

Mountains of the Alps
Mountains of Switzerland
Mountains of Graubünden
Two-thousanders of Switzerland
Klosters-Serneus